Carlos Canudas de Wit from the , Grenoble, France was named Fellow of the Institute of Electrical and Electronics Engineers (IEEE) in 2016 for contributions to modeling and control of mechanical, robotic, and networked systems.

References

Fellow Members of the IEEE
Living people
French engineers
Year of birth missing (living people)
Place of birth missing (living people)